Matthew Cox (born 1969) is an American felon and con man.

Matthew Cox may also refer to:
Matthew Cox (rugby union) (born 1988), English rugby player
Matt Cox, a musician in the band Witch Hats
Matthew Cox (football) (born 2003), English goalkeeper with Brentford FC

See also
Matthew Mason-Cox, Australian politician
Matthew Cocks (disambiguation)